Dawn Vincent is an Indian music composer, mixing engineer, and sound designer. He is a graduate from Film and Television Institute of India, Pune. He is also an accomplished pianist certified from Trinity College London. He works predominantly in Malayalam cinema. He is known for films such as Kammatipaadam, Adventures of Omanakuttan,  Eeda, Iblis, and Kala.

Early life and education
Dawn was born in Kochi, Kerala, to Vincent John and Sheena Nancy. He has a younger brother, Navin Vincent, who is a structural engineer and also an 8th grade solo guitarist certified from Trinity College London, London. He is married to Priscilla Vaddadi who is working as an animation supervisor in Canada.

Dawn studied in Bhavan's Vidya Mandir, Girinagar, Kochi. He was active as a keyboard player and bass guitarist during his school life. He was part of a rock band and their genre of music included versions of singles from various bands such as Metallica, Dream Theatre, Slipknot, Green Day, and Red Hot Chili Peppers. They also performed their own compositions and bagged prizes in many interschool competitions from 2004 to 2008. 

He graduated from Karunya University, Coimbatore in 2012 with an undergraduate Bachelor of Technology degree in Electronics and Media Technology. He then joined Film and Television Institute of India, Pune to pursue his Post Graduation Course in Sound Recording and Sound Design. As a student he was selected to do an on-location sound recording for a project in Internationale Filmschule Köln, Germany.

Musical career
Dawn initially composed music for short films. He started working in the industry by doing background score for the film, Mundrothuruth: Munroe Island, in 2016 directed by Manu along with his batchmates from the Film and Television Institute of India, Ashok and Subramanian. He made his breakthrough in the film Adventures of Omanakuttan as a music composer and sound designer, associating with his classmates Rohith V S (director) and Akhil George (cinematographer). He was later associated with Collective Phase One, which is a group of artists and filmmakers such as Rajeev Ravi, B. Ajithkumar, Madhu Neelakandan, Pramod Thomas and Kamal K M. He did the music arrangement and mixing for the songs from the film Kammatipaadam, starring Dulquer Salmaan and Vinayakan and directed by Rajeev Ravi.

Filmography

References

External links
 IMDb - Dawn Vincent Dawn Vincent
 Adventures of Omanakkuttan second video song is here 'Adventures of Omanakkuttan' second video song is here - Times of India
 Malayalam Sangeetham info List of Malayalam Movies by Musician Dawn+Vincent
 Mammootty releases audio of Iblis starring Asif Ali-Madonna Sebastian Mammootty releases audio of Iblis starring Asif Ali-Madonna Sebastian
 ഇവനൊരു 'ഇബ്‌ലീസാ'ണെന്ന് മമ്മുട്ടി... ഇവനൊരു 'ഇബ്‌ലീസാ'ണെന്ന് മമ്മുട്ടി
 Iblis is going to be very fresh and entertaining: Madonna Sebastian Iblis is going to be very fresh and entertaining: Madonna Sebastian
Tovino Thomas starrer ‘Kala’ releases on OTT
The Story Behind Kala’s Soundscape:The Story Behind Kala’s Soundscape: Using Dosa Batter, Wet Leaves, And Small Ponds In A Studio
First look poster of Kunchacko Boban's Nna Thaan Case Kodu go viral!Sunny Wayne’s next a drama, Appan
Secret of the sound: Robin Kunjukutty on working in Kala Secret of the sound: Robin Kunjukutty on working in Kala

Indian rock guitarists
Living people
People from Ernakulam district
Malayalam film score composers
1990 births
21st-century guitarists